Earl Clark (born 1988) is an American professional basketball player.

Earl Clark may also refer to:

 Earl Clark (American football) (1892–1959), football player and coach
 Earl Clark (baseball) (1907–1938), outfielder in Major League Baseball
 Earl Clark (US Army officer) (1919–2014), American military officer who helped to create the skiing industry
 Dutch Clark (Earl Harry Clark, 1906–1978), American football player and coach

See also
 Mel Clark (Melvin Earl Clark, 1926–2014), American Major League Baseball outfielder
 Mike E. Clark (Mike Earl Clark), American record producer and DJ